The 2016 Big Ten Conference women's soccer tournament was the postseason women's soccer tournament for the Big Ten Conference. It was held from October 30 to November 6, 2016. The seven match tournament began with first round matches held at campus sites, before moving to Elizabeth Lyle Robbie Stadium in Saint Paul, Minnesota for the semifinals and final. The eight-team single-elimination tournament consisted of three rounds based on seeding from regular season conference play. 

Minnesota Golden Gophers earned a number 4 seed at the NCAA women’s soccer tournament after defeating Rutgers Scarlet Knights 2–1 in the final.

Bracket

Schedule

Quarterfinals

Semifinals

Final

Awards
Individual Awards
 Offensive Player of the Tournament: Sydney Squires, Minnesota
 Defensive Player of the Tournament: Tori Burnett, Minnesota

2016 Big Ten Women's Soccer All-Tournament team
 Mykayla Brown, Indiana
 Nicky Waldeck, Michigan
 Tori Burnett, Minnesota
 Emily Heslin, Minnesota
 Sydney Squires, Minnesota
 Sydney Miramontez, Nebraska
 Nikia Smith, Northwestern
 Nickolette Driesse, Penn State
 Chantelle Swaby, Rutgers
 Madison Tiernan, Rutgers
 Rose Lavelle, Wisconsin

References

External links
2016 Big Ten Women's Soccer Championship

 
Big Ten Women's Soccer Tournament